Sheila S. Blair (born November 26, 1948) is a Canadian-born American art historian and educator. Blair has served as the dual Norma Jean Calderwood University Professor of Islamic and Asian Art at Boston College, along with her husband, Jonathan M. Bloom.

Career
Blair received her Bachelor of Arts in Art History and Sociology from Tufts University in 1970. She then continued education by receiving a Doctor of Philosophy in Art History and Middle Eastern Studies from Harvard University in 1980, graduating in the same exact program as her husband, Jonathan M. Bloom, whom she married in that year. Blair's doctoral dissertation was titled "The Shrine Complex at Natanz, Iran."

Following graduation from Tufts, Blair took a one-year position as an instructor of sociology at Shiraz University. After receiving her doctoral degree, she and Bloom were named Aga Khan Lecturers on Islamic Art and Architecture at Harvard University and at the Massachusetts Institute of Technology until 1981. In the following year, Blair was a lecturer at the University of Pennsylvania.

In 2000, Blair and Bloom were named to the dual professorship of Norma Jean Calderwood University Professor of Islamic and Asian Art at Boston College. In that same year, she served as the artistic consultant, with Bloom as principal consultant, for the documentary titled Islam: Empire of Faith. In 2006, they also began holding the joint post of Hamad bin Khalifa Endowed Chair of Islamic Art at Virginia Commonwealth University.

During the 2014-2015 academic year, Blair and Bloom held a research residency at the Shangri La Museum. The couple retired from teaching in 2018.

See also
List of Boston College people
List of Harvard University people
List of people from Montreal
List of Tufts University people

References

External links
Boston College profile

Living people
1948 births
Academics from Montreal
Canadian expatriate academics in the United States
Tufts University School of Arts and Sciences alumni
Harvard Graduate School of Arts and Sciences alumni
Women art historians
American art historians
Historians of Islamic art
Boston College faculty
Virginia Commonwealth University faculty